The Treaty of Rarotonga is the common name for the South Pacific Nuclear Free Zone Treaty, which formalises a nuclear-weapon-free zone in the South Pacific. The treaty bans the use, testing, and possession of nuclear weapons within the borders of the zone.

It was signed by the South Pacific nations of Australia, the Cook Islands, Fiji, Kiribati, Nauru, New Zealand, Niue, Papua New Guinea, Samoa, Solomon Islands, Tonga, Tuvalu, and Vanuatu on the island of Rarotonga (where the capital of the Cook Islands is located) on 6 August 1985, came into force on 11 December 1986 with the 8th ratification, and has since been ratified by all of those states.

The Marshall Islands, the Federated States of Micronesia, and Palau are not party to the treaties but are eligible to become parties should they decide to join the treaty in the future.

Protocols binding other states
There are three protocols to the treaty, which have been signed by the five declared nuclear states, with the exception of Protocol 1 for China and Russia who have no territory in the Zone.

no manufacture, stationing or testing in their territories within the Zone
no use against the Parties to the Treaty, or against territories where Protocol 1 is in force
no testing within the Zone

In 1996 France and the United Kingdom signed and ratified the three protocols. The United States signed them the same year but has not ratified them. China signed and ratified protocols 2 and 3 in 1987. Russia has also ratified protocols 2 and 3 with reservations.

Scope of applicability

The treaty's different provisions apply variously to the Zone, to the territories within the Zone, or globally.

"South Pacific Nuclear Free Zone" means the area :
south of the Equator
north of the 60th parallel south (the northern limit of the Antarctic Treaty zone)
east of the 115th meridian east
west of the 115th meridian west (the western limit of the Treaty of Tlatelolco Latin American Nuclear-Weapon-Free Zone)
plus three projections north of the Equator to include the territory and territorial waters of Papua New Guinea, Nauru, and Kiribati,
but minus the northwest corner beyond Australian territorial waters and near Indonesia (and the Southeast Asian Nuclear-Weapon-Free Zone).

Several islands in the Indian Ocean also belong to Australia and are therefore part of the zone.

"Territory" means internal waters, territorial sea and archipelagic waters, the seabed and subsoil beneath, the land territory and the airspace above them.
It does not include international waters.
Article 2 says "Nothing in this Treaty shall prejudice or in any way affect the rights, or the exercise of the rights, of any State under international law with regard to freedom of the seas."

The Treaty is an agreement between nation-states and as such of course cannot apply to those who have not signed the treaty or protocols, for example, the four countries not signatories to the Non-Proliferation Treaty, who are all nuclear powers.

List of states and territories
The only territory north of the Equator that is part of the Zone is in Kiribati, the only state straddling the Equator.
Micronesia is outside the Zone except for Kiribati.
Melanesia is inside the Zone except for Western New Guinea (a part of Indonesia), which is in the Southeast Asian Nuclear-Weapon-Free Zone.
Polynesia is inside the Zone except for Easter Island, which is in the Latin American Nuclear-Weapon-Free Zone, the Polynesian outliers of Kapingamarangi and Nukuoro in Micronesia, Hawaii, American Samoa and several uninhabited United States Minor Outlying Islands.

Carrying of nuclear weapons within the zone
U.S. bomber aircraft have been visiting Australia since the early 1980s, and nuclear-capable B-52s and B-2s operate regularly out of northern Australia. When U.S. bombers visit Australia, the U.S. government does not tell the Australian government whether the aircraft are carrying nuclear weapons. In 2023, the Australian Foreign Minister Penny Wong said the Australian Government "understand[s] and respect[s] the longstanding US policy of neither confirming or denying".

References

External links
Text of the treaty – FAS
Ratification status
Map of the Zone area (poor quality)

Treaties of Australia
Treaties of the Cook Islands
Treaties of Fiji
Treaties of Kiribati
Treaties of Nauru
Treaties of New Zealand
Treaties of Niue
Treaties of Papua New Guinea
Treaties of the Solomon Islands
Treaties of Tonga
Treaties of Tuvalu
Treaties of Samoa
Treaties of Vanuatu
New Zealand–Pacific relations
Treaties establishing nuclear-weapon-free zones
Treaties concluded in 1985
1985 in the Cook Islands
Treaties entered into force in 1986
Nuclear weapons governance
Rarotonga
Pacific Islands Forum treaties